Cronadun is a small village located in the West Coast region of New Zealand's South Island.  It is situated on the east bank of the Inangahua River, near its junction with Boatmans Creek. SH 69 and the Stillwater–Westport Line railway pass through the village.

Name 
Sometimes recorded as Cronaden and Cronadon, the locality was named by three brothers – Timothy, John, and Dominic Gallagher – after their home in County Donegal. Crough na dun (Irish:Cró na Doinne) means "hill of the fort", and Anglicised is Cronadun.

History 
In 1901 Cronadun had a population of 39, with a hotel, post office, store, and telephone bureau.

Railway 
For a few years, Cronadun was the terminus of the Stillwater–Westport Line as construction progressed from Reefton alongside the Inangahua River towards the Buller Gorge. Cronadun became the terminus in 1908, and the next section to Inangahua Junction opened in 1914.

References 

Buller District
Populated places in the West Coast, New Zealand